An Open Game (or Double King's Pawn Opening) is a chess opening that begins with the following moves:
1. e4 e5
White has moved the king's pawn two squares and Black has replied in kind. The result is an Open Game. Other responses to 1.e4 are termed Semi-Open Games or Single King's Pawn Games.

It should not be confused with the term "" (lowercase o and g), referring to a chess position where ranks, files and diagonals are open, and tending to more tactical gameplay.

Analysis
White opens by playing 1.e4, which is the most popular opening move and has many strengths—it immediately stakes a claim in the center, and frees two pieces (the queen and king's bishop) for action. The oldest openings in chess follow 1.e4. Bobby Fischer wrote that 1.e4 was "Best by test." On the negative side, 1.e4 places a pawn on an undefended square and weakens the squares d4 and f4. If Black keeps the symmetry by replying 1...e5, the result is an Open Game  .

Variations

The most popular second move for White is 2.Nf3 (the King's Knight Opening), attacking Black's king pawn, preparing to castle , and preparing for d2-d4. Black's most common reply is 2...Nc6, which usually leads to the Ruy Lopez (3.Bb5), Italian Game (3.Bc4), or Scotch Game (3.d4), though 3.Nc3 Nf6 (the Four Knights Game), often played in the late 19th to early 20th century, or, less commonly, 3....g6 or ...Bb4, (the Three Knights Game), are other possibilities.

Black's most popular alternative to 2...Nc6 is 2...Nf6, usually leading to Petrov's Defense, though White can avoid the extensive theory of the Petrov by playing 3.Nc3.

The Philidor Defense (2...d6) has the disadvantage of restricting the mobility of Black's king's bishop, and typically leads to solid but passive positions for Black. For this reason, it largely fell out of favor in the 20th century as Black players sought more dynamic options, however it is still occasionally seen at grandmaster level.

The Gunderam Defense (2...Qe7) is an offbeat choice which blocks the development of the king's bishop, and has never achieved widespread popularity.

The Elephant Gambit (2...d5) and the Latvian Gambit (2...f5) are considered very risky for Black, with the latter usually seen only in correspondence play. The Damiano Defense (2...f6) may be met by either 3.Nxe5 or 3.Bc4 with advantage and is almost never seen.

The most popular alternatives to 2.Nf3 are 2.f4 (the King's Gambit), 2.Nc3 (the Vienna Game), and 2.Bc4 (the Bishop's Opening). These three openings have some similarities; some of the quieter lines in the Vienna and Bishop's Opening can transpose to positional variations of the King's Gambit Declined, when White plays f2–f4 before playing Nf3. The King's Gambit was popular in the nineteenth century with grandmaster and amateur alike. White offers a pawn for speedy development, as well as to attack Black's central outpost. The Vienna Game also frequently features attacks on the Black center by means of f2–f4.

In the Center Game (2.d4), White immediately opens the center, though if the pawn is to be recovered after 2...exd4, White must prematurely develop their queen. An alternative is to sacrifice one or two pawns by offering the Danish Gambit (3.c3).

The early development of the queen in the Danvers Opening, also known as the Parham Attack (2.Qh5), is usually played only by amateurs, though Hikaru Nakamura has experimented with it in grandmaster tournaments and was able to achieve a reasonable position. The Napoleon Opening, 2.Qf3, has even less to recommend it as Black can easily block any mating threats without compromising their development. The Portuguese Opening (2.Bb5), Alapin's Opening (2.Ne2), Konstantinopolsky Opening (2.Nf3 Nc6 3.g3), and Inverted Hungarian Opening (2.Nf3 Nc6 3.Be2) are offbeat tries for White, though none promise any advantage in the face of correct play.

Examples of Open Games

 1.e4 e5 2.Bb5 Portuguese Opening
 1.e4 e5 2.c3 Centre Pawn Opening
 1.e4 e5 2.Nc3 Vienna Game
 1.e4 e5 2.Bc4 Bishop's Opening
 1.e4 e5 2.d4 exd4 3.c3 Danish Gambit
 1.e4 e5 2.d4 exd4 3.Qxd4 Center Game
 1.e4 e5 2.Ne2 Alapin's Opening
 1.e4 e5 2.Nf3 Nc6 3.Bb5 Ruy Lopez
 1.e4 e5 2.Nf3 Nc6 3.c3 Ponziani Opening
 1.e4 e5 2.Nf3 Nc6 3.Nc3 without 3...Nf6 Three Knights Game
 1.e4 e5 2.Nf3 Nc6 3.Nc3 Nf6 Four Knights Game
 1.e4 e5 2.Nf3 Nc6 3.Bc4 Italian Game
 1.e4 e5 2.Nf3 Nc6 3.Bc4 Bc5 Giuoco Piano
 1.e4 e5 2.Nf3 Nc6 3.Bc4 Bc5 4.b4 Evans Gambit
 1.e4 e5 2.Nf3 Nc6 3.Bc4 Be7 Hungarian Defense
 1.e4 e5 2.Nf3 Nc6 3.Bc4 Nf6 Two Knights Defense
 1.e4 e5 2.Nf3 Nc6 3.d4 Scotch Game
 1.e4 e5 2.Nf3 Nc6 3.Be2 Inverted Hungarian Opening
 1.e4 e5 2.Nf3 Nc6 3.g3 Konstantinopolsky Opening
 1.e4 e5 2.Nf3 d5!? Elephant Gambit
 1.e4 e5 2.Nf3 d6 Philidor Defence
 1.e4 e5 2.Nf3 f5 Latvian Gambit
 1.e4 e5 2.Nf3 f6 Damiano Defense
 1.e4 e5 2.Nf3 Nf6 Petrov's Defence
 1.e4 e5 2.Nf3 Qf6 Greco Defense
 1.e4 e5 2.Qf3?! Napoleon Opening
 1.e4 e5 2.f4 King's Gambit
 1.e4 e5 2.Qh5 Danvers Opening
 1.e4 e5 2.Ke2? Bongcloud Attack

Diagrams

See also 
 Closed Game (1.d4 d5)
 Encyclopedia of Chess Openings
 Flank opening (1.c4, 1.Nf3, 1.f4, and others)
 Irregular chess opening
 King's Pawn Game
 List of chess openings
 Semi-Closed Game (1.d4 other)
 Semi-Open Game (1.e4 other)

References

Further reading

 

Open Game
Chess terminology